Hoosier Creek is a stream in Franklin County in the U.S. state of Missouri. It is a tributary of the Meramec River.
 
Hoosier Creek most likely was named for the fact a share of the first settlers were natives of Indiana ("Hoosiers").

See also
List of rivers of Missouri

References

Rivers of Franklin County, Missouri
Rivers of Missouri